Lee Township is the name of some places in the U.S. state of Minnesota:
Lee Township, Aitkin County, Minnesota
Lee Township, Beltrami County, Minnesota
Lee Township, Norman County, Minnesota

See also
Lee Township (disambiguation)

Minnesota township disambiguation pages